Harry Blinman MVO, ISO (30 December 1861 – 23 July 1950) was an Australian cricket player, cricket administrator, and senior public servant in South Australia.

Born in Adelaide, Blinman was educated at Pulteney Grammar School under Headmaster W.S. Moore. He played 23 first-class cricket matches for South Australia. He also played Australian rules football for Norwood Football Club in the South Australian Football Association (SAFA).

Blinman had a long career as a senior public servant in South Australia, for which he was awarded membership of the Royal Victorian Order in 1920. He was the Premier's secretary and Clerk of the Executive Council from 1916 until his retirement in 1931. He was the state organiser for the visits of the Prince of Wales in 1920 and the Duke and Duchess of York in 1927. He was awarded the Imperial Service Order in 1928.

Blinman served on the South Australian Cricket Association (SACA) from 1900 until 1950. He was also a member of the Australian Cricket Board of Control from 1907 to 1919. He was a trustee of the SACA from 1924, and president from 1940 until his death in 1950.

He died at his home in East Terrace, Adelaide, where he had lived for 68 years, on 23 July 1950. He was a bachelor.

References

1861 births
1950 deaths
Cricketers from Adelaide
Australian cricketers
South Australia cricketers
Australian cricket administrators
Australian rules footballers from South Australia
Australian Members of the Royal Victorian Order
Australian Companions of the Imperial Service Order
Norwood Football Club players
Public servants of South Australia